Butyriboletus fuscoroseus is a pored mushroom in the family Boletaceae. It was formerly considered a species of Boletus, but in 2014 was transferred to the newly created genus Butyriboletus. Boletus pseudoregius, a European taxon originally described as a subspecies of Boletus appendiculatus in 1927,  is a synonym. B. fuscoroseus is considered critically endangered in the Czech Republic.

References

External links

fuscoroseus
Fungi described in 1912
Fungi of Europe